Double Edge is a 1992 Israeli-American thriller drama film written and directed by Amos Kollek and starring Faye Dunaway.

Cast
Faye Dunaway as Faye Milano
Amos Kollek as David
Mohammad Bakri as Mustafa Shafik
Makram Khoury as Ahmed Shafik
Michael Schneider as Max
Shmuel Shilo as Moshe
Anat Atzmon as Censor 
Ann Belkin as Sarah
Teddy Kollek as himself
Abba Eban as himself
Meir Kahane as himself
Hanan Ashrawi as herself
Ziad Abuzayyad as himself
Naomi Altaraz as herself

Release
The film premiered in New York City on September 30, 1992.

Reception
Kevin Thomas of the Los Angeles Times gave the film a negative review, calling it a "terrible movie but fascinating as a case study in star behavior."

References

External links
 
 

Israeli thriller drama films
English-language Israeli films
1990s English-language films
American thriller drama films
1990s American films